The Callistophytales was an order of mainly scrambling and lianescent plants found in the wetland "coal swamps" of Euramerica and Cathaysia.  They were characterised by having bilaterally-symmetrical, non-cupulate ovules attached to the underside of pinnules that were morphologically similar to the "normal" vegetative pinnules; and small compound pollen-organs, also borne on the underside of unmodified pinnules, that produced saccate pollen.  They were reproductively more sophisticated than most other Palaeozoic pteridosperms, some of which they seem to have out-competed and replaced in the "coal swamp" vegetation during Late Pennsylvanian and Permian times.

The inclusion of the Callistophytales within the Lyginopteridopsida is controversial because of the apparent sophistication of the ovules and pollen. There are nevertheless many other characters that suggest that the Callistophytales is derived from a more primitive lyginopterdalean-like ancestor, including the presence of a lagenostome at the apex of the nucellus, the general structure of the pollen organs, and the overall morphology of the vegetative structures.

Two families have been recognised: the Callistophytaceae, known mainly from the Carboniferous floras of Euramerica; and the Emplectopteridaceae, known mainly from the Permian floras of China and adjacent areas.

References

Pteridospermatophyta
Carboniferous plants
Permian plants
Prehistoric plant orders
Carboniferous first appearances
Permian extinctions